Zhuhai Cloud is a oceanography research vessel designed for uncrewed operations in open waters and as a mother ship for uncrewed vehicles. She has been called the first "drone mothership" and the first "unmanned vehicle carrier".

The ship was built by China State Shipbuilding Corporation's Huangpu Wenchong for Sun Yat-sen University's Southern Marine Science and Engineering Guangdong Laboratory. The laboratory's goal is to surveil an underwater and above water area 50 nautical miles in diameter using a network of unmanned devices.

Zhuhai Cloud may have military applications. Timothy Heath, a RAND Corporation analyst, believes these include accurately mapping depths for submarines, and deploying smart mines.

References

Research vessels of China